"Change the World" is a song by Japanese boy band V6. It was released on October 25, 2000 through Avex Trax, as the band's seventeenth single. The song was used as the first opening theme for the anime series InuYasha. The single peaked at number 3 on the Oricon singles chart and stayed on the chart for thirteen weeks. An English version of the song was covered by Inuyasha's voice actor in the Italian dub of the series, Massimiliano Alto, and it was used as the opening theme song when InuYasha aired in Italy.

Track listing
CD single
"Change the World"

"Silver Bells"
"Change the World" (Original Karaoke)
"Jōgen no Tsuki" (Original Karaoke)
"Silver Bells" (Original Karaoke)

Charts

References

2000 singles
2000 songs
Avex Trax singles
Inuyasha songs
Japanese-language songs